Encyclopedia of Conifers. A Comprehensive Guide to Conifer Cultivars and Species  is an encyclopedia written by Aris G. Auders and Derek P. Spicer, published in 2012. The two-volume, extensively illustrated encyclopedia is a complete reference book covering all recognised conifer cultivars and species, both hardy and tropical.  The 1,500-page work features names, synonyms, and brief descriptions, as well as information about height and spread after 10 years, where known, for over 8,000 cultivars and all 615 conifer species, plus their subspecies and varieties. Apart from the descriptive text, it is illustrated with more than 5,000 photographs, which have been taken especially for this encyclopedia.

Publication history 
The Encyclopedia of Conifers was written by Aris G. Auders, a conifer collector and photographer from Latvia, and Derek P. Spicer, Chairman of the British Conifer Society. The authors have been assisted by Lawrie Springate, RHS International Conifer Cultivar Registrar (2004–2009) and Victoria Matthews, RHS International Registrar. The publisher is Kingsblue Publishing Limited.

Illustration and design 
Photography by the authors shows the general appearance of the plants, and in many cases detail special features. Many were photographed in summer and winter to show colour and texture changes through the seasons.

References

External links 
 Official website
 Official USA Distributor
 Book Sample of Encyclopedia of Conifers
 Text Sample of Encyclopedia of Conifers
 Encyclopedia of Conifers on Facebook
 Review Library Journal
 Review Graham Rice
 Review the Gardening Times
 Royal Horticultural Society
 American Conifer Society

Encyclopedias of science
English-language encyclopedias